Cortinarius ohlone is a basidiomycete mushroom of the genus Cortinarius. Found in California, it was described as new to science in 2013 by Dimitar Bojantchev. The specific epithet refers to the Ohlone Native American people of California, who formerly inhabited the oak woods where the type collection was made.

See also
List of Cortinarius species

References

ohlone
Fungi described in 2013
Fungi of the United States
Fungi without expected TNC conservation status